The 2011 FIVB Women's Junior Volleyball World Championship was held in Lima and Trujillo, Peru from July 22 to 31, 2011.

Qualification process

 Serbia qualified as the best second place of the 2011 Women's Junior European Volleyball Championship Qualification's groups.

Venues
Coliseo Eduardo Dibos (Lima)
Coliseo Gran Chimu (Trujillo)

Pools composition

First round
All times are local (UTC−5).

Pool A

Pool B

Pool C

Pool D

Second round

Pool E (1st–8th)

Pool F (1st–8th)

Pool G (9th–16th)

Pool H (9th–16th)

Semifinal round

Classification 13th–16th

Classification 9th–12th

Classification 5th–8th

Semifinals

Final round

15th place match

13th place match

11th place match

9th place match

7th place match

5th place match

3rd place match

Final

Final standing

Individual awards

Most Valuable Player

Best Scorer

Best Spiker

Best Blocker

Best Server

Best Setter

Best Receiver

Best Libero

References

External links
 Official website.

FIVB Volleyball Women's U20 World Championship
Voll
International volleyball competitions hosted by Peru
FIVB Volleyball Women's U20 World Championship
Sports in Trujillo, Peru
2011 in youth sport